Çamlıbel Tarlası is a mid 4th millennium BCE Chalcolithic archaeological site, in northern central Anatolia, modern Turkey,

Excavations

Site
The excavations of the site were conducted from 2007–2009 as a cooperative project between  the  German Archaeological Institute and Edinburgh University,  in order  to  understand  the  prehistoric  periods  of  the  area preceding the rise of the Hittites; who founded their capital Hattusha 2.5 km east of Çamlıbel Tarlası.

There is evidence for both intensive metallurgy and permanent occupation. Anthracological analysis indicates that the primary fuel wood used was deciduous oak, which comprised nearly 90% of identifiable fragments. A large copper ore deposit has been discovered ca. 2 km upstream from the site.

Human activity and remains
Excavation has revealed four main phases of human activity interrupted by shorter periods of ephemeral use spanning an estimated time of 120 years.

The remains of 19 individuals were recovered from both pots burials and contexts without grave vessels, another possible nine individuals were recovered from secondary contexts.

Five juvenile individuals show signs of artificial cranial deformation. Similar deformations have been found on the juvenile remains from the chalcolithic site of Değirmentepe.

The people of Çamlıbel Tarlası practiced age-differential burial as babies and  very  young  children  were  buried  in  jars  as  possible secondary  burials,  underneath  house doors,  or  placed adjacent to the house walls. This is a phenomenon seen across other parts of the Near East in the (Late) Chalcolithic and into the Early Bronze Age; for example infant jar burials beneath  the  houses  of doors are seen during this period (ca. 5000–2500 BC) in the southern Levant and central and south eastern Anatolia. Older children and adults were inhumed in primary burials in the Hocker position.

References

Archaeological sites in Central Anatolia
4th millennium BC
Chalcolithic sites